Hans Hanson may refer to:

 Hans Hanson (politician), member of the 1935 South Dakota Senate
Hans Hanson House, an historic house in Marquette, Kansas

See also
Hans Hansson (disambiguation)
Hans Hansen (disambiguation)
Hanson (surname)